The ICC Men's T20 World Cup is the international championship of Twenty20 (T20) cricket. A Twenty20 International (T20I) is an international cricket match between two teams, each having T20I status, as determined by the International Cricket Council (ICC), the sport's world governing body. In a T20I, each team plays single innings, which is restricted to a maximum of 20 overs. In cricket, a player is said to have completed a century when he scores 100 or more runs in a single innings. As of the 2022 ICC Men's T20 World Cup, the most recent to take place, there have been ten centuries scored by nine players.

The first century in an ICC Men's T20 World Cup match was scored by Chris Gayle of the West Indies.  He achieved the feat in the inaugural match of the first Men's T20 World Cup (then called the World Twenty20) against the hosts South Africa on 11 September 2007. He scored 117 runs in 57 balls at Wanderers Stadium, Johannesburg.  This is the first and only instance in the championship of a player scored a century but his team lost the match. This century also made him the first player to score a century in all three formats of international cricket. Gayle's 100 runs in 50 balls remained the fastest Men's T20 World Cup century for almost nine years until he broke his own record during the 2016 ICC T20 World Cup when he scored an unbeaten 100 runs in 47 balls against England at Wankhede Stadium, Mumbai. With his two centuries he remains the only batsman to have scored more than one century in the championship. Gayle's 117 runs remained the highest individual score in the Men's T20 World Cup for almost five years until Brendon McCullum of New Zealand broke it during the 2012 edition. He scored 123 runs in 58 balls against Bangladesh at Pallekele Stadium, Kandy, on 21 September 2012. His 100 runs in 51 balls remains the third-fastest century in the Men's T20 World Cup after Gayle's centuries. The second and third batsmen to score a century in the championship were Suresh Raina of India and Mahela Jayawardene of Sri Lanka respectively, both during the 2010 ICC Men's T20 World Cup. Their respective centuries helped them to achieve the feat of scoring a century in all the international formats of the game, only previously achieved by Gayle and McCullum.

Centuries 
, the most recent edition to take place, nine batsmen have scored ten centuries in the ICC Men's T20 World Cup.

Footnotes

See also 

 List of Cricket World Cup centuries
 List of centuries in women's Twenty20 International cricket

References

External links
 Records / World T20 / High scores. ESPN Cricinfo
 Fastest T20 Hundreds (Balls Faced) HowSTAT

ICC Men's T20 World Cup
Centuries
Centuries